The princess is a fairy chess piece that can move like a bishop or a knight. It cannot jump over other pieces when moving as a bishop but may do so when moving as a knight. The piece has acquired many names and is frequently called  archbishop, or cardinal; it may also simply be called the bishop+knight compound.

Chess moves in this article use A as notation for the princess.

Movement
The princess can move as a bishop or a knight.

History and nomenclature

The princess is one of the most simply described fairy chess pieces and as such has a long history and has gone by many names. It was first used in Turkish Great Chess, a large medieval variant of chess, where it was called the vizir (not to be confused with the piece more commonly referred to as the wazir today, which is the (1,0) leaper). It was introduced in the West with Carrera's chess, a chess variant from 1617, where it was called a centaur, and has been used in many chess variants since then.

The name archbishop was introduced by José Raúl Capablanca in his large variant Capablanca chess. He originally called it the chancellor, but he later changed the names, and the rook+knight compound became known as the chancellor. Both of these names refer to higher ranks than the bishop in the Roman Catholic Church, but archbishop does so more obviously to most people and thus became more popular. In fact, the name archbishop has been used for other augmented bishops as well, such as the reflecting bishop (which reflects off the sides of the board) and the bishop+wazir compound. Christian Freeling, the inventor of Grand Chess, took a similar approach to Capablanca, naming the piece the cardinal.

Princess is the most widely used name among problemists. By analogy with the queen, which is a rook+bishop compound, it was decided that the three basic combinations of the three simple chess pieces (rook, knight, and bishop) should all be named after female royalty. Since the bishop+knight compound is obviously weaker than the rook+knight compound (as the bishop is weaker than the rook), the name princess was assigned to the bishop+knight compound, while the rook+knight compound was named the empress.

Value

The princess is worth approximately 8 pawns. Computer self-play studies show that a single pawn is enough to compensate the difference between queen and princess on an 8×8 board, as well as that, on 10×8 boards, princess plus pawn even has a slight advantage over queen. This may seem counterintuitive, as the value difference of these pieces' non-bishop-components (rook vs. knight) is closer to 2 pawns, implying an unusually large synergy between the bishop and knight move. A mathematical approach used to determine relative piece value in Musketeer Chess estimated the value of the princess as 770 centipawns on an 8x8 board.

Princess versus rook is usually a draw, as is queen versus princess. King and princess versus king is a forced win for the side with the princess; checkmate can be forced within 17 moves. In comparison, the queen requires 10 moves and the rook requires 16. A princess can checkmate a lone king without the aid of its own king in a position where the enemy king is in the corner and the princess is two spaces diagonally away from it, but this position cannot be forced.

Ralph Betza (inventor of chess with different armies, in which the princess was used in one of the armies) rated the princess as about seven points, intermediate between a rook and a queen, noting that it was "a weak Queen" and that its 12 directions of movement is greater than the queen's 8 directions. However, all three of his alternate armies for that game are actually stronger than the standard FIDE army which they were supposed to equal, reflecting the general tendency for players to undervalue pieces which they are unfamiliar with; Larry Kaufman commented that this is particularly true for the princess.

Symbol

Both white and black symbols for the princess were added to version 12 of the Unicode standard in March 2019, in the Chess Symbols block:

🩐 U+1FA50 WHITE CHESS KNIGHT-BISHOP
🩓 U+1FA53 BLACK CHESS KNIGHT-BISHOP

See also
 Amazon—the rook+bishop+knight compound
 Empress—the rook+knight compound
 Queen—the rook+bishop compound

Notes

References

Bibliography
 Piececlopedia: Bishop–Knight Compound by Fergus Duniho and David Howe, The Chess Variant Pages
 Endgame statistics with fantasy pieces by Dave McCooey, The Chess Variant Pages
 The NB (Princess) by Ralph Betza, The Chess Variant Pages
 BuyPoint Chess by Ralph Betza; contains a list of pieces with approximate values
 Great Chess - Indian / Turkish variant by Hans Bodlaender, The Chess Variant Pages

Fairy chess pieces